Sanaroa Island is an island, part of D'Entrecasteaux Islands in Papua New Guinea, located east of Fergusson Island in Milne Bay Province, at .
The population of Sanaroa is less than 2000.

Education
Sanaroa has one primary school run by the Catholic Church. Students come from all over Sanaroa, some walking or canoeing 5 km to school.  Many of the students have rarely or never left the island, and have little exposure to urban life. The island's two main religions are the United Church and Catholic Church. In 2007 a Christian Mission Fellowship church was established. Today many students have formally done grade 8 and many have continued to High Schools. However the biggest problem that the students face is school fees and unfortunately for many have withdrawn from school. Despite the problems  a few others have been assisted and supported by their parents and relatives have ventured to find jobs in towns and are working. Education is recently seen as important to raise the standard of living and bringing changes to the villages and families.Another elementary school has been built at Siawawa section to cater for children due to distance.The person behind the planing and building of the school is Mr Papu Martine from Kogeta Village.

Council areas 
Sanaroa's three council areas are Etana, Siawawa Udaudana and Tewala island.
The island have four council areas maily sourrended by sea.

Language
Sanaroa has a language that has faded or disappeared. The local people call it the K language because the 'k' sound was used frequently. Today there no persons speaking the language.The last women who used the "K" language was Mis Abokagu from Gadigadili Village.

Life style
The local people live a subsistence-farming life style. The people on  the island go fishing and do gardening to feed themselves. The staple foods are yams, sago, fish and bananas. They use canoes, dinghies and other sea-going vessels as transport. There are no trucks, cars, mains power or airports on the island.
The economy of the island heavyly depend on the sea or the marine resource to earn cash from outside communities

Natural events
Sanaroa island is experiencing erosion due to wave action, and some smaller islands appear to be  sinking slowly.

D'Entrecasteaux Islands
Islands of Milne Bay Province